If He Hollers, Let Him Go! is a 1968 American neo noir crime film written and directed by Charles Martin (1910-1983), based on the 1945 novel of the same title by Chester Himes.

Plot

Cast 
 Dana Wynter as Ellen Whitlock
 Raymond St. Jacques as James Lake
 Kevin McCarthy as Leslie Whitlock
 Barbara McNair as Lily
 Arthur O'Connell as Prosecutor
 John Russell as Sheriff
 Ann Prentiss as Thelma Wilson
 Royal Dano as Carl Blair

References

External links 

1968 films
1968 crime drama films
American crime drama films
Films about miscarriage of justice
Films based on American novels
Films scored by Harry Sukman
1960s English-language films
Films directed by Charles Martin
1960s American films